Here Comes That Sound Again is a 1979 disco single by Love De-Luxe, a dance studio group formed by British producer, Alan Hawkshaw. Vicki Brown and Jo-Ann Stone were the lead vocalists on the single.
The single hit number one on the dance charts in the middle of 1979, for one week. The single did not cross over to any other chart and Love De-Luxe had no other charted singles in the United States. However, elements from the song were used for the intro to the Sugarhill Gang's hit single "Rapper's Delight".

The song’s chorus would later be sampled in another Billboard Dance Club Songs number one single, "That Sound" by Pump Friction, in 1997.

Chart performance

References

1979 singles
1979 songs
Disco songs
Songs about dancing
Warner Records singles